Weirwood is an unincorporated community in Northampton County, Virginia, United States on Virginia's Eastern Shore

Transportation
The hamlet and surrounding area are served by Campbell Field Airport.

Eastern Shore Adventure Sports, Inc. operates the Eastern Shore Hang Gliding Center at Campbell Field Airport in Weirwood.  There is hang glider traffic within the vicinity of Campbell Field Airport, especially on weekends.

References

External links
GNIS reference

Unincorporated communities in Virginia
Unincorporated communities in Northampton County, Virginia